Zhong Chenle (born 22 November 2001), known mononymously as Chenle (Hangul: 천러), is a Chinese singer and actor based in South Korea. Zhong began his career as a child singer, having performed in various concerts and television shows in China and abroad. At age nine, he became the youngest singer to be invited to perform solo at the Golden Hall of Vienna. Through his solo career, Zhong has release three albums and hosted one concert in China. At the age of fourteen, Zhong signed with South Korean entertainment company SM and subsequently moved to South Korea in 2016 to debut as a member of the South Korean boy band NCT through sub-unit NCT Dream, which went on to become one of the best-selling boy bands in South Korea.

Early life
Zhong was born in Shanghai, China on 22 November 2001. He studied at the Beijing Contemporary Music School, graduating alongside NCT bandmate Renjun in the class of 2020. In 2006, Chenle entered the Shanghai Ying Siu Sing School and attended dance classes. In 2008, he was admitted to the Shanghai Little Flute Art Troupe and studied vocal music with Huang Jing.

Career

2009–2015: Pre-debut and solo activities 
In 2009, Zhong participated in the Hajj children's channel held by Yueyue Elf Vs Season Trial, where he was runner-up and won the Elf Genie Award. In 2010, he participated in the National Chinese Young Talent Selection and won a gold medal.

In January 2011, at age nine, Zhong was invited to perform the song "Memory" from Andrew Lloyd Webber's musical Cats at the Golden Hall of Vienna; at the time, he was the youngest singer to have ever performed solo there. On 16 June, Zhong led the audience in singing the Chinese national anthem at the second Nie Er Music Week opening ceremony in the Shanghai Grand Theater. In July, Zhong released his twelve-track second solo album, My Wings. At the end of the month and in August, Zhong participated in the opening and closing ceremonies of the Shanghai International Children's Art Festival on the Shanghai Grand Stage at the Shanghai International Convention Center.

Zhong began his professional career as a singer after participating in singing competitions such as China's Got Talent. He has released three albums. He used to perform cover songs, many of which were of former child star Declan Galbraith, and upload them to YouTube. Zhong joined the World Organization of Child Ambassadors of Peace, headquartered in Washington, D.C. and founded and presided over by pianist, songwriter, and producer Ezekiel Elkin, representing China as a young cultural diplomat. Zhong served as Chinese Ambassador at an international multicultural show created by Elkin in Buenos Aires in August 2014; he performed "The Dragon's Romance", a song Elkin wrote specifically for him.

In December 2012, Zhong participated in the First Plenary Session of the Huangpu District of Shanghai and elected the district chief with the highest votes. His first known minor acting roles were in 2013, when he featured in Chinese drama The Queen of SOP 2 at age 11. In 2014, Zhong held a solo concert at the Shanghai Concert Hall.

2016–present: Debut with NCT and NCT Dream 

In August 2016, at age 14, Zhong began his career as an idol in South Korea by debuting as a member of NCT Dream, a sub-unit of NCT.

Zhong became the main DJ of the radio show Yuedong Seoul on 12 October 2020, which aired from 9 pm to 10 pm KST and was live-streamed on the official TBS eFM 101.3 MHz YouTube channel. Zhong departed Yuedong Seoul on 12 September 2021.

In February 2021, Zhong featured on the song "Too Good" from IMLAY's fourth EP Utopia.

Discography

Albums
 Tomorrow (2010)
 My Wings (2011)
 You Are There (2014)

Singles

Filmography

Film

Television

Variety show

Radio show

Awards and nominations

References

NCT (band) members
2001 births
Living people
Singers from Shanghai
Chinese expatriates in South Korea
21st-century Chinese male singers
Chinese child singers
Chinese male child actors
Chinese dance musicians
Chinese idols
Chinese pop singers
Chinese K-pop singers
Korean-language singers of China